Thomas Mikkelsen (born 19 January 1990) is a Danish footballer who plays as a forward for Kolding IF. 

He has previously played for FC Sydvest 05, Vejle BK, Vejle Kolding and FC Fredericia, and for Ross County and Dundee United in Scotland and IFK Göteborg in Sweden.

Playing career
Mikkelsen played youth football for Bredebro IF before joining his first senior club, FC Sydvest 05, where he scored 11 goals in 14 league appearances. He was then signed by Vejle Boldklub, and later played for the merged club Vejle Kolding.

After a year at FC Fredericia, he signed for Danish Superliga team OB in 2014. After joining OB, he was loaned to IFK Göteborg in Sweden, Mikkelsen was an unused substitute for IFK Göteborg in their 2015 Svenska Cupen Final victory. After a successful loan spell at Vejle BK Mikkelsen was loaned back out during 2017 to Scottish Championship team Dundee United in Scotland. He scored the winning goal for Dundee United after coming on as a substitute in the 2017 Scottish Challenge Cup Final, as they won 2–1 against St Mirren.

On 4 July 2017, it was announced that Mikkelsen had signed a two-year deal with Scottish Premiership club Ross County. He made his debut for the club against Alloa in the League Cup. After just two league starts and seven appearances from the bench, Mikkelsen returned on loan to Dundee United in January 2018 for the remainder of the 2017–18 season. Mikkelsen along with five other first-team players were released from Ross County after the club's relegation to the Scottish Championship.

On 14 June 2018 Mikkelsen signed for Icelandic team Breiðablik. Leaving the club in the summer 2021, Mikkelsen returned to Denmark and joined Danish 2nd Division club Kolding IF on a deal until June 2024.

Career statistics

Honours

Club
IFK Göteborg 
 Svenska Cupen: 2014–15
Dundee United 
 Scottish Challenge Cup: 2016–17

References

External links
 

1990 births
Living people
Danish men's footballers
Danish expatriate men's footballers
Association football forwards
Odense Boldklub players
IFK Göteborg players
Dundee United F.C. players
FC Sydvest 05 players
Vejle Boldklub players
FC Fredericia players
Ross County F.C. players
Thomas Mikkelsen
Kolding IF players
Danish Superliga players
Danish 1st Division players
Allsvenskan players
Scottish Professional Football League players
Thomas Mikkelsen
Danish expatriate sportspeople in Iceland
Danish expatriate sportspeople in Sweden
Danish expatriate sportspeople in Scotland
Expatriate footballers in Iceland
Expatriate footballers in Sweden
Expatriate footballers in Scotland